The former French Catholic diocese of Senez existed from around the fifth or sixth century, until the French Revolution. Its see was at Senez, in southern France, in the modern department of Alpes-de-Haute-Provence. After the Concordat of 1801 the territory of the diocese was added to that of the diocese of Digne.

History
Marcellus (Marcel), the first known bishop of Senez, attended the Council of Agde in 506; nevertheless, Senez must have been an episcopal city as early as 439.

Jean Soanen, the Oratorian, noted for his opposition to the papal bull Unigenitus, was Bishop of Senez from 1696 until the time of his deposition in 1727.

Bishops

Ursus c. 450
Marcellus (Marcel) I. 475?-c. 506
Simplice 541-552
Vigile 585-588
Marcel II. c. 615
Peter I. c. 993-1027
Ameil 1028-1043
Hugo 1043-c. 1057
Stephan 1060-c. 1089
Peter II. 1089-1108
Aldebert de Castellane c. 1123-c. 1146
Erard (Isnard) 1155-1159
Pons 1170-1174
Maurel c. 1189
William I. 1213-1215
Johann I. 1217-1238
Peter III. 1238-1242?
Wilhelm II. 1242-1243
Sigismund 1243-1245
Wilhelm III. 1246-1255
Raimund 1255-1260
Bertrand de Séguret 1290-1312
Albert c. 1315
Bertrand II. 1317-1346
Bertrand III. 1346-1358
Bertrand IV. 1358-1362
Pierre D'Aynard 1362-1368
Robert Gervais c. 1368-c. 1390
Isnard de Saint-Julien 1392-1408
Aimon de Nicolaï 1408-1409 (then bishop of Huesca)
Jean de Seillons 1409-1442
Georges de Clariani 1442-1459
Elzéar de Villeneuve 1459-1490
Nicolas de Villeneuve 1492-1507
Nicolas de Fieschi 1507-1512 (Cardinal)
Jean-Baptiste de Laigue D'Oraison 1512-1546
Pierre de Quiqueran de Beaujeu 1546-1550
Nicolas de Jarente de Senas 1550?-1551
Théodore Jean de Clermont de Talard 1551-1560 ?
Jean de Clausse de Monchy (Mouchy) 1561-1587
Louis de Bertons de Crillon 1587-1601 (administrator)
Jacques Martín 1601-1623
Louis Duchaine 1623-1671
Louis Anne Aubert de Villeserin 1671-1695
Jean Soanen 1696-1727
Vacant 1727-1741
Louis Jacques François de Vocance 1741-1756
Antoine-Joseph D'Amat de Volx 1757-1771
Étienne François Xavier des Michels de Champorcin 1771-1773 (then bishop of Toul)
Jean-Baptiste-Charles Marie de Beauvais 1774-1783
Sixte-Louis-Constance Ruffo (Roux) de Bonneval 1783-1784
Jean-Joseph-Victor de Castellane Adhémar 1784-1788
Jean-Baptiste-M.-Scipion Ruffo (Roux) de Bonneval 1789-1790

See also 
 Catholic Church in France
 List of Catholic dioceses in France

Notes

Bibliography

Sources
 pp. 548–549. (Use with caution; obsolete)
  p. 301. (in Latin)
 p. 175.

 p. 219.

Studies

 
Senez
1801 disestablishments in France